Four Continents Short Track Speed Skating Championships is an annual short-track speed-skating competition. It was established by the International Skating Union in 2019 to allow athletes from outside Europe to compete at the event. Its inaugural event was held in 2020, while its second and third editions were cancelled in 2021 and 2022 due to the coronavirus pandemic. The second edition of the event is expected to be held from 10–12 November 2022 in Salt Lake City, United States of America.

Editions of the games
 2020 Four Continents Short Track Speed Skating Championships:  Montreal, Canada
 2023 Four Continents Short Track Speed Skating Championships:  Salt Lake City, United States of America
 2024 Four Continents Short Track Speed Skating Championships:  Laval, Canada

Medal holders

Men's events

500 metres

1000 metres

1500 metres

5000 metre relay

Women's events

500 metres

1000 metres

1500 metres

3000 metres

Mixed event

Accumulative medal summary

Sources
 2020: Results book
 2023: Results book

References

Four Continents Short Track Speed Skating Championships
Short track speed skating competitions